Carl Marchese (November 17, 1905 Milwaukee, Wisconsin – June 26, 1984 Valrico, Florida) was an American racecar driver who competed in the 1929 Indianapolis 500 race. He was later an Indy 500 car entrant and entered his own Marchese chassis in the 1950 and 1951 races. He was elected to the Wisconsin Athletic Hall of Fame in 1978.

Indy 500 results

Indianapolis 500 results of cars constructed by Marchese

References

Indianapolis 500 drivers
1905 births
1984 deaths
Racing drivers from Milwaukee
Racing drivers from Wisconsin
Sportspeople from Milwaukee
People from Valrico, Florida